The Merseyside International Open was a golf tournament on the European Tour in 1980. It was held at Royal Liverpool Golf Club, Hoylake near Liverpool, England. It was won by England's Ian Mosey, who defeated Tony Jacklin in a playoff. Mosey beat Jacklin at the first extra hole.

Winners

References

External links
Coverage on the European Tour's official site

Former European Tour events
Golf tournaments in England